Trinodes is a genus of beetles in the family Dermestidae, the skin beetles. The genus is distributed in the Palearctic, Oriental, and Afrotropical realms. There are about 16 species.

Species include:

 Trinodes albohirsutus Kalík, 1965
 Trinodes amamiensis Ohbayashi, 1977
 Trinodes carinatus Pic, 1916
 Trinodes cinereohirtus Motschulsky, 1863
 Trinodes emarginatus Arrow, 1915
 Trinodes hirtus Fabricius, 1781
 Trinodes insulanus Zhantiev, 1988
 Trinodes minutus Pic, 1915
 Trinodes niger Matsumura & Yokoyama, 1928
 Trinodes puetzi Háva & Prokop, 2006
 Trinodes rufescens Reitter, 1877
 Trinodes rufithorax Pic, 1926
 Trinodes senegalensis Pic, 1915
 Trinodes sinensis Fairmaire, 1886
 Trinodes tonkineus Pic, 1922
 Trinodes villosulus Dahl, 1823

References

Dermestidae